Gaëtan Picon (19 September 1915 – 6 August 1976) was a French author: essayist, art and literature critic, and art and literature historian. He was director of the Mercure de France and Director-General of Arts and Letters under André Malraux. He wrote an entry for the Encyclopaedia Universalis on Swiss publisher Albert Skira.

Selected Bibliography 
 Balzac: Balzac par lui-même. (1956). Microcosme ecrivains de toujou. Editions du Seui, Paris. 191 pp.
 Ingres: Biographical and Critical Study (1967) The Taste of Our Time, Vol. 47. Editions d'Art Albert Skira, Geneva 131 pp.
 The Work of Jean Dubuffet (1973). Albert Skira, Geneva. 233 pp.
 Surrealists and Surrealism 1919-1939 (1977). Skira/Rizzoli International Publications, Inc., New York.  231 pp.
 Birth Of Modern Painting (1978). Rizzoli International Publications, Inc., New York. 135 pp.
 Jean-Auguste-Dominique Ingres (1980). Published by Skira/Rizzoli International Publications, Inc., New York. 151 pp.

References

External links 
Worldcat Identities: Gaëtan Picon, Overview http://www.worldcat.org/identities/lccn-n50019731/

1915 births
1976 deaths
French art critics
French male essayists
People of Ligurian descent
20th-century French essayists
20th-century French male writers